Euploea desjardinsii is a butterfly in the family Nymphalidae. It is found on Rodrigues and is likely to be extinct.

References

External links
Seitz, A. Die Gross-Schmetterlinge der Erde 13: Die Afrikanischen Tagfalter. Plate XIII 25

Butterflies described in 1844
Euploea
Endemic fauna of Mauritius